William J. Van Patten (September 9, 1848 – February 13, 1920) was a Vermont businessman, philanthropist and politician who served as President of the Vermont State Senate.

Biography
William James Van Patten was born in Wauwatosa, Wisconsin on September 9, 1848.  Following the death of his father, his mother moved to Vermont to live near relatives, and Van Patten was raised in Bristol and Middlebury.  He settled in Burlington, Vermont in 1864 and worked as an apprentice at the A. C. Spear Drug Store.  He subsequently joined the drug manufacturing firm of Wells, Richardson & Company, owned by William Wells and rose to the executive ranks.

Van Patten became an expert in aniline dyes, which had been discovered in England in the mid-1800s.  His success at creating and finding household uses for these compounds made Wells, Richardson one of the country's leading producers of them, and Van Patten became wealthy as a result.

Van Patten was President of the Champlain Manufacturing Company, which produced blinds, doors and sashes.  He was also President of Burlington's Malted Cereals Company and the Burlington Building and Loan Association, as well as a Director of the Queen City Cotton Company.

He was also active in the YMCA, and served as its national president from 1882 to 1889.  In addition, Van Patten was President of the Mary Fletcher Hospital, and a Trustee of the Fletcher Free Library.

A Republican, Van Patten served as Mayor of Burlington from 1894 to 1895.  During his term the city created its first paid fire department and its first paved streets.  Van Patten also spent extensively of his personal funds to beautify the city, including projects such as planting trees and shrubs in rights of way, and the creation of Ethan Allen Park.

He remained active in city affairs after leaving the mayor's office, serving on the board of cemetery commissioners from 1898 to 1911, and the board of park commissioners from 1903 to 1911.

Interested in history and genealogy, Van Patten was also a member of the Society of Colonial Wars and the Sons of the American Revolution.

Van Patten was elected to the Vermont Senate in 1906.  He served one term, and was chosen to serve as Senate President.

William J. Van Patten died in New York City on February 13, 1920.  He was buried in Burlington's Lakeview Cemetery.

References

External links

|-

|-

|-

|-

1848 births
1920 deaths
People from Wauwatosa, Wisconsin
Mayors of Burlington, Vermont
Republican Party Vermont state senators
Presidents pro tempore of the Vermont Senate
Burials at Lakeview Cemetery (Burlington, Vermont)
YMCA leaders